Rock Run Township is located in Stephenson County, Illinois. As of the 2010 census, its population was 2,247 and it contained 969 housing units. The villages of Rock City and Davis are located in the township.

Geography
Rock Run is Townships 27 (part) and 28 (part) North, Range 9 East of the Fourth Principal Meridian.

Mills
Carnefix Mill, a three–story stone grist mill was built at Irish Grove four miles south of Davis on Rock Run creek by George Raymer in the 1850s. The mill was still standing in 1970.

Davis Manufacturing Company Mill, built in Davis in 1876, was a three and one–half story stone flour mill with four run of stone powered by steam. The mill closed in 1880 and was demolished.

Epplyanna Mill (Section 15) a three–story stone grist mill was built on Rock Run north of Rock City by James Epley in 1854. It ceased operation in 1910. After 1910 it was used as a barn. It was demolished by dynamite in 1955.

Demographics

References

External links
City-data.com
Stephenson County Official Site

Townships in Stephenson County, Illinois
Townships in Illinois